General elections were held in Mali on 19 June 1979. They followed a 1974 referendum that approved a new constitution allowing for the direct election of the President for the first time. The country was a one-party state at the time, with the Democratic Union of the Malian People (UDPM) as the sole legal party. Its leader, Moussa Traoré, who had overthrown Modibo Keïta in 1968, was the only presidential candidate, and was elected unopposed. In the National Assembly elections several UDPM candidates were able to contest each seat, with 44% of the incumbent MPs defeated. Voter turnout was reported to be 97%.

Results

President

National Assembly

References

1979 in Mali
Mali
Elections in Mali
Single-candidate elections
One-party elections
Presidential elections in Mali
Election and referendum articles with incomplete results
June 1979 events in Africa